Tantilla tritaeniata, commonly known as the three-banded centipede snake, is a species of small colubrid snake. The species is endemic to Guanaja Island of Honduras.

References

Colubrids
Reptiles described in 1966
Reptiles of Honduras
Endemic fauna of Honduras